Gustavo Huet Bobadilla (22 November 1912 – 20 November 1951) was a Mexican athlete. He was born in Mexico City, Mexico. He competed in shooting and represented Mexico at the 1932 Summer Olympics in Los Angeles. He won a silver medal in the Men's 50 meter rifle, prone.

References

External links
 

1912 births
1951 deaths
Mexican male sport shooters
ISSF rifle shooters
Shooters at the 1932 Summer Olympics
Shooters at the 1936 Summer Olympics
Shooters at the 1948 Summer Olympics
Olympic silver medalists for Mexico
Olympic medalists in shooting
Medalists at the 1932 Summer Olympics
Sportspeople from Mexico City
20th-century Mexican people